Saint George is a Russian Saint George icon created in Veliky Novgorod before the Mongol invasion of Rus' in the 12th century. The main icon of the Yuriev Monastery for a long time, it is kept at the Tretyakov Gallery at the moment.

The date of its creation is unknown, but 1130 was agreed upon as this date is on the back of the icon. However, the back itself was only made in the 19th century. Art critics also state either 1030, which is the foundation year of the Yuriev Monastery, or 1130-1140s to the Yuriev Monastery's consecration ceremony. This theory is supported by art historians Viktor Lazarev, Engelina Smirnova and Natalya Salko. Viktor Lazarev states that its size is suitable for that purpose. 

The iconography corresponds to the common since 10th-century Byzantium depiction of Saint George not as a warrior, but as a young martyr.

See also 
 List of oldest Russian icons

References 

Icons of the Tretyakov Gallery
12th-century Christianity
12th-century paintings
1130